Browns Plains is a suburb in the City of Logan, Queensland, Australia.

Browns Plains is generally used as a name for both the Browns Plains suburb and the former estates which all utilise the 4118 Postcode Hillcrest, Forestdale, Regents Park and Heritage Park. Browns Plains has been identified in the South East Queensland Regional Plan as an outer city regional centre.

Geography
The suburb's western boundary is marked by the Mount Lindesay Highway.

Scrubby Creek, a tributary of Slacks Creek, which is itself a tributary of the Logan River, is the main waterway in the area.

History
The names Browns Plains became in use as a place name in 1840. The district was mostly used for growing tobacco until the 1950s . The first Cobb and Co coach services were running through Browns Plains as early as 1863.

In 1872, George Stretton operated a post office from his accommodation house in Browns Plains.

Brown's Plains Provisional School opened circa 1878 open on site of Waller Park, only to close due to effects of major drought in 1902.

Greenbank and Browns Plains telephone lines were installed in 1938.

A post office and store opened in 1956, with the post office being named Brownsleigh. The following year Scrubby Creek Bridge was built over Browns Plains Road.

In 1966, Beaudesert Shire employed consultant town planner and architect James Birrell.

Beaudesert Shire gazetted the old Browns Plains School site as waste treatment plant and refuse depot (now known as Waller Park).

Browns Plains Tavern opened in 1976.

A new post office was opened in 1980 and the name reverted to Browns Plains.

St Bernardine's Catholic School opened on 27 January 1982; it is now within the neighbouring suburb of Regents Park.

Browns Plains State School opened on 24 January 1983.

Westpoint Shopping Centre opened in 1984 with Waller Park established that same year.

Browns Plains State High School opened on 29 January 1985.

The new Logan West Library, which replaced the old one near the Greenbank RSL, opened in 2003.

The median age of the Browns Plains population was 32 years, six years below the national median of 38.  59.8% of people living in Browns Plains were born in Australia, slightly lower than the national average of 66.7%. The other top responses for country of birth were New Zealand 9.2%, England 2.1%, Philippines 1.8%, India 1.6% and China 1.3%.  69.7% of people spoke only English at home; the next most common languages were 2.8% Mandarin, 1.5% Samoan, 1.3% Hindi and 1.2% Urdu.

Education 

Browns Plains State School is a government primary (Early Childhood-6) school for boys and girls at 1-29 Mayfair Drive. In 2018, the school had an enrolment of 551 students with 45 teachers (42 full-time equivalent) and 30 non-teaching staff (19 full-time equivalent). It includes a special education program.

Browns Plains State High School is a government secondary (7-12) school for boys and girls in Ivor Street. In 2018, the school had an enrolment of 988 students with 88 teachers (84 full-time equivalent) and 47 non-teaching staff (33 full-time equivalent). It includes a special education program.

Amenities 

Browns Plains consists of numerous commercial facilities on Browns Plains Road, including the Grand Plaza Shopping Centre, which opened in 1994 and was extended 13 years later. Grand Plaza has 170 specialty stores, Big W, Target, Kmart, Woolworths, Coles, Aldi and an Event Cinema complex.

The Logan City Council operate the Logan West public library at 69 Grand Plaza Drive.

There are a number of parks in the suburb, including:

 Acacia Park
 Adam Park

 Barrallier Place Park

 Eyre Place Park

 Fleet Park

 Forestglen Park

 Grosvenor Park

 Harmony Court Park

 Koala Park

 Michelle Johnstone Park

 Ranchwood Ave Park

 Waller Park

 Zorina Park

Events 
Browns Plains frequently has visits from the circus and other events on the vacant land in between Waller Park and Forest Glen Park.

Transport
Browns Plains Grand Plaza is a terminus for Brisbane City bus services, making it an important transport hub connecting Logan City and Brisbane City bus services.

References

External links

 
 

Suburbs of Logan City